The Cities Service Concerts were musical broadcasts which had a long three-decade run on radio from 1925 to 1956, encompassing a variety of vocalists and musicians sponsored by Cities Service.

The concerts began with trial broadcasts in the New York area during 1925 and 1926. 
Graham McNamee was the announcer and the Goldman Band conducted by founder Edwin Franko Goldman performed when the hour-long program began February 18, 1927, on NBC; it changed to a symphonic sound with Rosario Bourdon conducting a 30-piece NBC house orchestra that summer along with the Cavaliers Quartet. 

On January 3, 1930, Jessica Dragonette brought her repertoire of 500 songs to the series, often doing duets with Frank Parker and generating top ratings during the 1930s. She was replaced by soprano Lucille Manners in 1937. Other performers during this period were Robert Simmons and James Melton. Along with the Cities Service Singers, baritone Ross Graham (1905-1986) arrived in 1939. Graham was also heard on Show Boat. Maestro Dr. Frank Black headed the show from at least 1938 to 1942 along with Manners and Graham.

The title changed to Highways in Melody in 1944 when Paul Lavalle was the orchestra leader. Lavalle continued after the show was retitled yet again as The Cities Service Band of America which experimented with simulcasting (audio broadcast separately over the radio) in 1949 and 1950. The series came to an end on January 16, 1956.

References

1920s American radio programs
1930s American radio programs
American music radio programs
NBC radio programs
Citgo